Andrew of Constantinople (Andrew the Fool-for-Christ or Andrew, the Fool; ; died in 936) is considered a saint by the Eastern Orthodox Church, and is revered as a Fool for Christ.

Andrew, a Slav by birth, was a slave of Theognostus, who was serving as a bodyguard in Constantinople. Later, he decided to become a Fool for Christ, living out his goal with humility and patience.

According to certain sources, Andrew had a vision of the Most Holy Theotokos in the Blachernae church of Constantinople, while the city was surrounded by enemy troops (by some sources, Muslim Arabs).

Andrew and his disciple Epiphanus testified that they saw the Holy Virgin surrounded by many angels and Saints, praying and extending her Omophorion (protection) over the faithful. After this vision, Constantinople was saved when its attackers retreated. That vision and the avoidance of Constantinople's destruction that was attributed to it inspired the creation of one of the most famous Eastern Orthodox holidays: the feast of the Protection of the Theotokos.

Andrew died in 936. His memory is commemorated by Eastern Orthodox communities on 15 October (2 October old calendar). The earliest manuscript of his Greek hagiography, the Life of Andrew the Fool, is a quire in Munich in a 10th-century uncial script. The work was also translated into Georgian and Slavonic.

See also
Foolishness for Christ
The Protection of the Mother of God

References

External links
Andrew the Fool-for-Christ in Orthodoxwiki
The Greek, tenth-century, vita of Saint Andrew the Fool (BHG 115z) with English translation: L. Rydén, The Life of St Andrew the Fool, vol. 1 & vol. 2 (Uppsala 1995) - Open access.

Byzantine saints of the Eastern Orthodox Church
936 deaths
10th-century Christian saints
Year of birth unknown
Marian visionaries
Angelic visionaries